Ha, also known with the Bantu language prefix as Giha, Igiha, or Kiha, is a Bantu language spoken by the Ha people of the Kigoma Region of Tanzania, spoken on the eastern side of Lake Tanganyika up to the headwaters of the Mikonga. It is closely related to the languages of Rwanda and Burundi; neighboring dialects are reported to be mutually intelligible with Kirundi.

Further reading
 Bichwa, Saul S. 2018. "The Role of Prosodic Units in the Study of Giha." Arusha Working Papers in African Linguistics, 1(1): 81-90.

References

External links
 Bible recordings in Ha
 Brief overview of Ha

Languages of Tanzania
Rwanda-Rundi languages